Kale is a village in the Municipality of Žalec in east-central Slovenia. It lies in the Ložnica Hills north of Šempeter v Savinjski Dolini. The area is part of the traditional region of Styria. The municipality is now included in the Savinja Statistical Region.

A small chapel-shrine in the settlement dates to the late 19th century.

References

External links
Kale at Geopedia

Populated places in the Municipality of Žalec